Summit High School is a four-year comprehensive public high school in Summit, in Union County, New Jersey, United States, serving students in ninth through twelfth grades as the lone secondary school of the Summit Public Schools. The school has been accredited by the Middle States Association of Colleges and Schools Commission on Elementary and Secondary Schools since 1934.

As of the 2021–22 school year, the school had an enrollment of 1,156 students and 107.0 classroom teachers (on an FTE basis), for a student–teacher ratio of 10.8:1. There were 112 students (9.7% of enrollment) eligible for free lunch and 33 (2.9% of students) eligible for reduced-cost lunch.

History
The school opened in 1888 due to an increased need for a publicly operated secondary school within the City of Summit. The school's athletic teams are referred to as the Hilltoppers, though the school's actual mascot is a mountain goat wearing a Summit High School athletic jersey. The school's colors are maroon, white and gold, although for most of its history they were maroon and white.

The school was originally located in a building constructed in the 1920s on Morris Avenue between Maple and Elm Streets near downtown Summit.  It shared this building with the junior high school until 1936, when Edison Junior High School opened in east Summit. However, a number of parents outside of east Summit—then called "Deantown"—objected to their children traveling to this section of the city. By 1943, the new junior high school had closed and the high school again shared the Morris Avenue building with the junior high school. (The building still houses the junior high school, now known as Lawton C. Johnson Summit Middle School.)

In 1962, the high school relocated to a larger, more modern facility located at 125 Kent Place Boulevard, slightly outside of downtown Summit and within the Washington Elementary School district.  In the late 1990s, a push was made to renovate the high school. From 2000 until 2003, the high school building underwent a series of renovations, including the construction of a new media center, cafeteria, gymnasium, and science laboratories.  Special attention was also paid to upgrading the building's existing facilities and to increasing the information technology capacities of classrooms.

Awards, recognition and rankings

The school was the 38th-ranked public high school in New Jersey out of 339 schools statewide in New Jersey Monthly magazine's September 2014 cover story on the state's "Top Public High Schools", using a new ranking methodology. The school had been ranked 15th in the state of 328 schools in 2012, after being ranked 25th in 2010 out of 322 schools listed. The magazine ranked the school 22nd in 2008 out of 316 schools. The school was ranked 20th in the magazine's September 2006 issue, which included 316 schools across the state.

Schooldigger.com ranked the school 85th out of 381 public high schools statewide in its 2011 rankings (a decrease of 37 positions from the 2010 ranking) which were based on the combined percentage of students classified as proficient or above proficient on the mathematics (88.3%) and language arts literacy (96.7%) components of the High School Proficiency Assessment (HSPA).

In the 2011 "Ranking America's High Schools" issue by The Washington Post, the school was ranked 17th in New Jersey and 687th nationwide.
The school was ranked 419th in Newsweek's 2009 ranking of the top 1,500 high schools in the United States and was the ninth-ranked school in New Jersey, with 2.289 AP tests taken in 2008 per graduating senior and 47% of all graduating seniors passing at least one AP exam; The school was ranked 441st nationwide in 2008.

In its 2013 report on "America's Best High Schools", The Daily Beast ranked the school 461st in the nation among participating public high schools and 38th among schools in New Jersey. The school was ranked 251st in the nation and 22nd in New Jersey on the list of "America's Best High Schools 2012" prepared by The Daily Beast / Newsweek, with rankings based primarily on graduation rate, matriculation rate for college and number of Advanced Placement / International Baccalaureate courses taken per student, with lesser factors based on average scores on the SAT / ACT, average AP/IB scores and the number of AP/IB courses available to students.

In its listing of "America's Best High Schools 2016", the school was ranked 76th out of 500 best high schools in the country; it was ranked 16th among all high schools in New Jersey and fourth among the state's non-magnet schools.

Extracurricular activities

The drama club has been extremely successful. In 2006 the Spring Musical "Les Misérables" sold out every night and required that the company put on an extra performance. This was the first year Summit High School participated in the Rising Star program and it was nominated for twelve Rising Star awards.  In 2007, the spring musical was Titanic, which sold out almost every performance. Anne Poyner, the director, entered the production into the Paper Mill Playhouse Rising Star Awards, a statewide competition of excellence in New Jersey high school musicals. Summit High School received 12 final nominations. In June, Titanic ended up winning a record seven Rising Star Awards, including Outstanding Overall Production of a Musical, making Summit High School the top theatre school program in the state of New Jersey. In 2008, their production of Fiddler on the Roof was nominated for 11 awards, including, for the third year in a row, Best Overall Production of a Musical. In 2009, their production of Music Man was nominated for 17 awards. The school's 2013 production of Beauty and the Beast was recognized with six Rising Star awards, the most of any school in the state, including recognition for Outstanding Overall Production and Outstanding Direction. The cast took home the award for Best Musical. In 2018, their production of Legally Blonde, starring Erin Manion and Mitchell Sink as Elle Woods and Emmett Forrest respectively, had unprecedented success and since the full show was uploaded to the school theatre's official YouTube channel, has received more than 1,000,000 views.

The Forensics Team reached the National Forensic League's National Speech and Debate Tournament in recent years. In January 2011, the team, coached by John Kratch and Anne Poyner, won the First Place Sweepstakes Trophy at the Freehold High School Speech Tournament. It competes in individual and team debates. It placed 33rd out of 240 public forum debate teams at an invitation-only national competition held at Harvard University in 2011. In 2013, the team competed in a national tournament held in Birmingham, Alabama, and won an Award of Excellence in Speech which was given to the top 20 schools with the highest point totals, out of several hundred that competed. In 2014, the Summit team competed in seven New Jersey tournaments and three national tournaments, bringing home four first place and three second place sweepstakes trophies as well as more than 100 individual awards. Summit High School debaters advanced to quarter finals in public forum at the Harvard Invitational Tournament, as well as to the final rounds of three of the six offered "speech" events. As of March 2014, the Summit High School Forensics team was ranked 3rd statewide and 12th nationally for the 2013-2014 year in terms of "Team Sweepstakes", or cumulative winnings per season.

Athletics

The Summit High School Hilltoppers compete in the Union County Interscholastic Athletic Conference, which is comprised of public and private high schools in Union County and was established following a reorganization of sports leagues in Northern New Jersey by the New Jersey State Interscholastic Athletic Association Prior to the NJSIAA's 2010 realignment, the school had competed as part of the Iron Hills Conference, which included public and private high schools in Essex, Morris and Union counties. With 875 students in grades 10-12, the school was classified by the NJSIAA for the 2019–20 school year as Group III for most athletic competition purposes, which included schools with an enrollment of 761 to 1,058 students in that grade range. The football team competes in Division 3 of the Big Central Football Conference, which includes 60 public and private high schools in Hunterdon, Middlesex, Somerset, Union and Warren counties, which are broken down into 10 divisions by size and location. The school was classified by the NJSIAA as Group III North for football for 2018–2020.

The school participates as the host school / lead agency for a joint wrestling team with Chatham High School. This co-op program operates under agreements scheduled to expire at the end of the 2023–24 school year.

Summit High School's athletic teams were the winner of the 2014-15 ShopRite Cup for Group III, finishing with 67 points, one point ahead of Northern Highlands Regional High School.

The boys' basketball team won the Group III (then known as Class B) state championship in 1929, defeating Weehawken High School by a score of 25–24 in the tournament final. The 2005 team won the North II, Group II state sectional championship with a 61–58 win over Hillside High School.

The boys' soccer team won the Group III state championship in 1956 (vs. Dwight Morrow High School), 1957, 1961 (vs. Paramus High School), 1969 (vs. James Caldwell High School), 1974 (vs. Ewing High School), 1976 (as co-champion with Sterling High School) and 1977  (as co-champion with Sterling High School). The 1956 team finished the season with a 10-2-1 record after winning the Group III state title with a 3-1 victory against Dwight Morrow in the playoff finals.

The boys' tennis team won the Group III state championship in 1969 (vs. Millburn High School) and 2014 (vs. Northern Highlands Regional High School), and won the Group II title in 2003 (vs. Rumson-Fair Haven Regional High School). The team won the Group II state championship in 2003 with a 4–1 win over Rumson-Fair Haven.

The football team won the NJSIAA North II Group III state sectional championships in 1976, 1980, 2012, 2013 and 2018, and won the North II Group II titles in 1988, 1993, 1994 and 2009. The 1976 team finished the season with a 9-1-1 record after winning the North II Group III sectional title with a 40–0 win against West Essex High School in the championship game. The 1993 team held off a furious comeback by West Morris Mendham High School in the championship game to win the North II Group II title by a score of 26-21 and finish the season 11–0. The 2009 football team finished 12–0, winning the 2009 North II Group II title with a 28–19 win over Orange High School in a game played at Giants Stadium. The football team won the North II Group III state championship in 2012 and 2013, winning 24 consecutive games during those two seasons. The 2018 team won the North II Group III state sectional championship with a 36–14 win against Rahway High School in the tournament final.

The girls' track team won the Group III indoor relay state championship in 1981.

The men's lacrosse team won state championships in 1981 (defeating Montclair High School in the tournament final) and in 1983 (vs. Columbia High School). The team won the Group I title in 2005 (vs. Mountain Lakes High School), 2010 (vs. Madison High School), 2012 (vs. Glen Ridge High School), and won the Group II title in 2009 (vs. Moorestown High School), 2011 (vs. Chatham High School), 2014 (vs. Somerville High School), 2015 (vs. Cranford High School), 2018 (vs. Rumson-Fair Haven Regional High School) and 2019 (vs. Somerville). The team's 11 group championships are the tied-most of any school in the state. The team won the Tournament of Champions in 2009 (vs. Delbarton School) and 2010 (vs. St. Joseph High School of Metuchen). The men's lacrosse team made it to the state championship in 2001, falling 8–3 to Moorestown in the championship game, after a 4–2 semi-final win over Delbarton School. The team won the Group II title in 2009 against Moorestown, winning by a score of 9–8 on a goal scored in the last minute of the game. After losing in the Tournament of Champions to Delbarton School in 2005, the 2009 team defeated Delbarton by a score of 8–4 and in 2010 the team won the ToC against St. Joseph High School. The 2002 men's lacrosse team was ranked #1 in the state before falling to #2 Ridgewood High School in the state semi-finals. They finished the year ranked #4.

The women's lacrosse team won the overall state championship in 1986 (defeating Cinnaminson High School in the tournament final) and 1999 (vs. Moorestown High School). The team won the Group II state title in 2013 (vs. Allentown High School), 2014 (vs. Red Bank Catholic High School) and 2015 (vs. Rumson-Fair Haven Regional High School), and won the Group III title in 2016 (vs. Moorestown High School) and 2017 (vs. Moorestown). The program's total of seven group titles is tied for the third-most in the state. The 2017 team won the Group III title in 2017 with a 9–8 win against Moorestown on a goal scored in the final minute of play at Kean University.

The girls' tennis team won the Group II state championship in 1998 with a 3–2 win against Moorestown High School and finished ranked in the top 5 in the state. In 2007, the women's tennis team won the North II, Group II state sectional championship with a 3–2 win over Mountain Lakes High School in the tournament final.

The ice hockey team won the Public B state championship in 2012, its first title. They would go on to win the Public C state champion in 2018, 2019 and 2020. In 2000, the team surprised the #1-seeded team from Brick Township High School and eventually lost in the public school final game to second-seeded Bayonne High School by a score of 6–3. The team won the Public C State Championship in 2018, defeating Chatham High School by a score of 3–0. The 2020 tea defeated Ramsey High School by a score of 5-2 to win the Public C state championship for the third year in a row.

The men's swim team was 13–2 in the 2007–08 swim season, losing only to Seton Hall Preparatory School in the regular season and Mountain Lakes High School in the sectional finals of the state tournament. By the 2012–13 season the team took home the state championship. The team was recognized by Michael Phelps by their accomplishments.

The field hockey team won the North II Group II state sectional title in 2009 and 2014, and won the North II Group III title in 2015.

The boys cross country team won the Group III state championship in 2014. The team qualified for the Meet of Champions for the first time in school history, placing 14th out of 20 teams. They also won the Union County Tournament for the first time in school history.

Athletic facilities

The Metro Homes Sports Complex, better known as Tatlock Field, one of the biggest fields in the county, located on Butler Parkway (a short distance from the high school), is used as Summit High School's main venue for football, men's lacrosse, and track and field.  In the early 2000s the field was converted to FieldTurf due to frequent problems with poor field conditions.  A grant was made by the Metro Homes Corporation, and the football stadium has been renamed Metro Homes Field.  Tatlock also includes a field house with locker room facilities and practice fields adjacent to Washington Elementary School. Junior varsity and middle school tennis practices at the four tennis courts adjacent to the track complex.
Memorial Field is located a short drive from the high school on Larned Road near Brayton School.  This large public field (currently operated by the Board of Recreation) is used for soccer, cross country, baseball and softball.  This field complex is also used extensively by Summit's youth sports programs. Varsity and junior varsity tennis matches are played at the new eight-court complex next to Brayton School. It is also the only field that has been sold out in the town's history, when the varsity played on it, before the HS Upper Field was being rebuilt. Around 67 people came to watch that game. Since then, Summit has brought in big crowds.
Warinaco Rink, located in Warinaco Park in Elizabeth is shared by Summit High School, Westfield High School, Arthur L. Johnson High School in Clark, and Cranford High School as a home hockey venue.  The Summit High School hockey team also uses several other local rinks for practice and has hosted home games at the newer, smaller Union Sports Arena, also located in Union Township.
Summit High School Gymnasium, the high school's main gymnasium, is used to host men's and women's basketball as well as volleyball.  The high school's second (newer) gymnasium used primarily as a practice facility.
Summit High School Lower Field, located directly behind the high school, is used for field hockey, women's lacrosse, and physical education classes.
Buntin and Hurst Pools, located at the Summit YMCA in downtown Summit, these facilities are utilized by the men's and women's swimming teams.
Summit High School Upper Field, located directly behind the high school, is used for boys' JV and varsity soccer, and lacrosse. It was being rebuilt into a FieldTurf.

Administration
Core members of the school's administration are:
Stacy Grimaldi, Principal
Elizabeth Aaron, Assistant Principal
Brian Murtagh, Assistant Principal

Science

As of 2019, the general pattern for students is to study physics in ninth grade, chemistry in tenth grade, and biology in eleventh grade; these subjects can be studied at different levels, from modified to regular and to advanced/honors. Science department supervisor Tom O'Dowd explained that "teaching physics in ninth grade has been identified as the best option because physics is the fundamental science ... It is potentially the most concrete and the best suited for inquiry-based learning." A movement towards teaching physics has been going on for years, explained one school spokesperson, who explained that physics is "more basic than biology" and "makes for a more rigorous and thoughtful curriculum."

Generally honors and AP programs require test scores or honors applications (see chart) for a student to be accepted, and students in these programs are expected to maintain a B− average or better to continue in the next year's accelerated science courses. It is possible for students to apply for a more accelerated course each year by getting a favorable teacher recommendation or applying to an honors course. (One note not shown on chart: students taking modified biology in grade ten have a choice to study environmental science in their eleventh grade year.) Students in their sophomore, junior, or senior years of high school also have the option of participating in a shared-time program offered through the Union County Vocational Technical Schools (UCVTS). Student enrolled in the shared-time program can receive science credits for their coursework at UCVTS, and should discuss this option for science credit with their guidance counselors.

Single semester electives are available to juniors and seniors in the following subjects: Forensic science; Marine Biology/Oceanography; Design Projects in Science; and Astronomy. Full-year courses for seniors include: Environmental science, Honors physics, and AP study. AP courses offered include: AP Environmental Science, AP Biology, AP Chemistry, AP Physics C, and AP Physics B. Generally, honors and AP courses have prerequisites of past study in honors or AP courses (and maintaining grades of B− or better in those courses); and students can be admitted via a teacher recommendation.

School counseling 

As of 2017, the School Counseling Department has 12 staff members, including a Director, seven School Counselors, one College Counselor, one Student Assistance Counselor, and two Administrative Assistants. The department helps students with post-secondary planning, scheduling, extracurricular involvement, academic support, and social and emotional counseling and programming. They also host various evening events to inform the community about post-secondary planning, making the most of the high school experience, and student health and wellness. College representatives typically visit during the fall and meet with students who are interested in attending their college. Counselors meet with students and families in small groups and have an individual family conference in winter/spring of junior year. The school subscribes to a web-based college information database called Naviance which helps students choose colleges as well as provides data about how past Summit seniors fared with particular colleges. It also provides resources for personality assessment and career exploration.

English
Emphasis is on written and oral communication. The curriculum seeks to develop students' reading, writing, speaking, listening, viewing (media literacy), and critical thinking. There is a Writing Center for assistance which is staffed during school hours by English teachers.

Ninth graders have a choice of a Global Studies course which will meet for two periods each day; it teaches literacy skills with literature in a historical context and combines freshman English and world history. English 1 is also offered, as a one-period course, and it will teach literacy skills including reading and writing and focuses on putting text in a thematic or literary context. The choice of which course to take should be based on a student's learning style; the Global Studies course will have more interaction and cooperative-based learning. Both English and Global Studies will require a research project to be completed. School authorities decided to eliminate ninth grade English honors in 2009 to permit a "fairer, more efficient process for assessing the willingness and readiness of students to enter the honors program in tenth grade," according to one account. Students can apply for English 2 Honors taught in tenth grade.

Journalism is taught as an elective one-semester course and includes entry-level exposure to the SHS student newspaper. Honors and AP courses are open by application to students in grades 11 and 12. And a course in public speaking will be replaced by a course entitled "21st century media and communications." Among the retirees include English teacher novelist Robert Kaplow whose bestselling novel Me and Orson Welles was made into a film.

History
Summit high school offers a variety of programs in history, including World History. Instructors emphasize the importance of understanding how people in past times thought about their situation, and encourage students to see the multiplicity of factors underlying historical events as well as how individuals changed history. History in 9th grade starts with World History and then can continue to U.S. History and U.S. History Honors.

Languages
Different courses of language instruction are offered, including French, Latin, Spanish, and Mandarin Chinese which is "getting more and more popular", according to one account.

Mathematics

The Summit High School math department offers a variety of instructional paths allowing students who work hard to accelerate or decelerate their program as their needs change.

The department offers a two-year algebra program as a way to "firmly develop the concepts" of the course; the aim is "establishing a stronger foundation of Algebra 1 concepts (to) increase the potential of the student to reach Honors level courses," according to a letter to parents. School board officials suggested that a two-year algebra sequence will lead to "increased participation and greater success," and was phased in from 2010 through 2012. It is expected that greater numbers of students will complete the sequence in pre-calculus. Instructor David Pease, during back–to–school night, asked parents to solve mathematics questions (click on reference) to impart to parents a sense of what their sophomores experience as students. The school lends graphing calculators to students for their use throughout some courses such as trigonometry, and expects the calculators to be returned in functional condition at the end of the school year. Each teacher has specific grading metrics based on such measures as attendance, quizzes and tests, homework, special assignments, classroom participation, projects, and so forth. Summit mathematics instructor Michael Thayer was a college champion on the TV game show Jeopardy! representing Rutgers University in 1990, and was recognized by a Cornell student as having had a strong academic influence in his life.

Students who progress quickly have an opportunity to take Advanced Placement (AP) courses such as AP Calculus AB or BC and, as a result, possibly qualify for college credit. The highest level course is Multivariable Calculus. In addition, electives such as Personal Finance, AP Statistics, AP Computer Science A, and AP Computer Science Principles are offered.

Notable alumni

 Michael Badgley (born 1995), football placekicker for the Indianapolis Colts of the National Football League.
 Anthony James Barr (born 1940), creator of the SAS Language and co-founder of SAS Institute.
 Mark Berson (born 1953), men's soccer coach at the University of South Carolina.
 Marshall Curry (born , class of 1988), documentary filmmaker Academy Award-winning director, producer, cinematographer and editor whose films include The Neighbors' Window, Street Fight, Racing Dreams, If a Tree Falls: A Story of the Earth Liberation Front and Point and Shoot.
 Mark Di Ionno (born 1956), journalist and writer.
 Bob Franks (1951-2010), politician who represented New Jersey's 7th congressional district from 1993 to 2001.
 Kathy Heddy (born 1958, class of 1976), swimmer who competed in 1976 Summer Olympics in Montreal, where she finished 5th in 400 meter freestyle.
 Ryan O'Malley (born 1993 class of 2011), tight end with the New York Giants of the NFL.
 Dennis Ritchie (1941–2011), creator of the C programming language and co-inventor of the UNIX operating system.
 Seth Ryan (born 1994), football coach.
 Herb Schmidt, retired soccer and lacrosse player and coach.
 Willie Wilson (born 1955, class of 1974), former Major League Baseball player for the Kansas City Royals, Oakland Athletics, and Chicago Cubs.

References

External links

Official ebpage
Summit High School sports

Data for Summit Public Schools, National Center for Education Statistics

Summit, New Jersey
1888 establishments in New Jersey
Educational institutions established in 1888
Middle States Commission on Secondary Schools
Public high schools in Union County, New Jersey
School buildings completed in 1962